William Joseph Nardini (born 1969) is an American lawyer who serves as a United States circuit judge of the United States Court of Appeals for the Second Circuit.

Early life and career 

Nardini earned his Bachelor of Arts, summa cum laude, from Georgetown University and his Juris Doctor, from Yale Law School, where he served as Executive Editor of the Yale Law Journal. Nardini subsequently earned a Master of Laws from the European University Institute. After graduating from law school, Nardini served as a law clerk to Judges José A. Cabranes from 1994 to 1995, and Guido Calabresi of the United States Court of Appeals for the Second Circuit from 1995 to 1996, and to Associate Justice Sandra Day O'Connor of the Supreme Court of the United States from 1996 to 1997.  received his LL.M. in European, Comparative, and International Law European University Institute in Fiesole, Italy, in 1998. He sewrved as a consultant for the Italian Constitutional Court. Nardini then went on to serve as an Assistant United States Attorney for the District of Connecticut from 2000 to 2010, where he prosecuted criminal cases and was promoted to Deputy Chief of the Criminal Division.  From 2010 to 2014, he served as the Justice Department Attaché to the United States Ambassador to Italy.  He once again served as an AUSA from 2014 to 2019, as Chief of the Criminal Division until his appointment to the Second Circuit.

Federal judicial service 
On August 28, 2019, President Donald Trump announced his intent to nominate Nardini to serve as a United States Circuit Judge of the United States Court of Appeals for the Second Circuit. On September 19, 2019, his nomination was sent to the United States Senate. He was nominated to fill the seat vacated by Judge Christopher F. Droney, who assumed senior status on June 30, 2019. On September 25, 2019, a hearing on his nomination was held before the Senate Judiciary Committee. On October 24, 2019, his nomination was reported out of committee by a 19–3 vote. On November 6, 2019, the Senate voted 87–3 to invoke cloture on his nomination. On November 7, 2019, his nomination was confirmed by a 86–2 vote. He received his judicial commission on November 14, 2019.

See also 
List of law clerks of the Supreme Court of the United States (Seat 8)

References

External links 
 

1969 births
Living people
20th-century American lawyers
21st-century American lawyers
21st-century American judges
Assistant United States Attorneys
Connecticut lawyers
European University Institute alumni
Georgetown University alumni
Judges of the United States Court of Appeals for the Second Circuit
Law clerks of the Supreme Court of the United States
People from Glen Ridge, New Jersey
United States court of appeals judges appointed by Donald Trump
Yale Law School alumni